St. Mary's College, Manarcaud is a government aided college of higher education located in Manarcaud town, Kerala, India. It was founded on August 7, 1981, by the St. Mary's Jacobite Syrian Cathedral Manarcad.
The college is affiliated to Mahatma Gandhi University Kottayam and was re-accredited  with B grade by NAAC in May 2015. The college is recognized under the sections 2(f) and 12B of the UGC Act 1956. The Government of Kerala has recognized the college as a Special Grade College.

Notable alumni
 Kalabhavan Shajohn, Actor

References

Universities and colleges in Kottayam district
Colleges affiliated to Mahatma Gandhi University, Kerala
Educational institutions established in 1981
1981 establishments in Kerala